Rivermaya is a Filipino alternative rock band. Formed in 1994, it is one of the several bands who spearheaded the 1990s Philippine alternative rock explosion.

Rivermaya is currently composed of original members Mark Escueta and Nathan Azarcon, together with longest serving guitarist Mike Elgar. Notable former original members include chief songwriter Rico Blanco and vocalist Bamboo Mañalac, who later formed the band Bamboo and later went on his solo career.

Rivermaya is one of the top thirty best-selling artists in Philippine history.

History

Earlier formation (1993)
The band's predecessor consisted of Jesse Gonzales on vocals, Kenneth Ilagan on guitars, Nathan Azarcon on bass guitar, Rome Velayo on drums, and Rico Blanco on keyboards and backing vocals whom Azarcon recommended to the management after hearing him play his portable piano rendition of Metallica's "Seek & Destroy" during the audition process. They were managed by Lizza Nakpil and director Chito S. Roño who had the intention of molding the group into a rock show band. The group was then called Xaga.<ref

Classic lineup and mainstream success (1994–2001)
In the process of grueling practice sessions, Azarcon's schoolmate Francisco "Bamboo" Mañalac replaced Gonzales who was asked to leave the band; Azarcon's childhood friend Mark Escueta replaced Velayo who left due to undisclosed reasons, and Ilagan, who later left the band due to personal reasons, was replaced with Perfecto "Perf" de Castro who owned the rehearsal studio where the band used to jam. With Bamboo as frontman, the band members disbanded Xaga and formed the band Rivermaya, a name initially suggested by de Castro. They started putting together original songs like "Ulan" [Rain], "214", and "Awit ng Kabataan" [Song of the Youth] (mostly composed by Rico Blanco) in demo form for prospective recording companies.

By November 1994, the band had released its first album, the self-titled Rivermaya, and its first single was "Ulan"; followed by "214". Both songs were critically acclaimed.

Citing artistic differences with the management, Perf de Castro was adamant in leaving the group in late 1995 and returned to his project band "The Blues Trio", a band later renamed "Axis" until its final inception as "Triaxis." The band continued as a quartet and Rico Blanco became the full-time guitarist while Nathan Azarcon's friend J-John Valencia filled in as session additional guitar player on live shows.

The band's second album Trip, released in 1996, contains the singles "Kisapmata" [Blink of an Eye], "Himala" [Miracle], "Flowers", "Princess of Disguise" and "Panahon Na Naman" [It's Time Once Again]. Whilce Portacio, co-creator of the X-Men's "Bishop" and co-founder of Image Comics, illustrated the album art for Trip.

On January 31, 1997, the band released its third album, Atomic Bomb, with the single "Hinahanap-hanap Kita" [Always Wanting to See You]. The album gained positive responses from listeners and received heavy airplay from radio stations. In October 1998, Rivermaya also released the Rivermaya Remixed album, put together with the help of DJ Toti Dalmacion of Groove Nation.

Departure of Bamboo Mañalac (1998)
The band then embarked on a US and Canada tour in 1998. Despite the band's successful tour, It was also at this time that Bamboo Mañalac decided to stay in the U.S. with his family. His last show with the band was on October 10, 1998, in Oakland, CA. (he eventually went on to form his eponymous band in 2003).

Rivermaya decided to forge on, with Rico Blanco taking on lead vocals and released their fourth album, It's Not Easy Being Green on January 15, 1999, containing the singles "Nerbyoso" [Nervous], "Shattered Like", and "Rodeo". the album hits Gold barely a month after the album was released.

On January 22, 2000, the band performed at the  Nescafe's Open Up concert in Baguio City with Mike Hanopol. On June 30, 2000 the band performed at Channel [V] Philippines Concert for Peace at the University of the Philippines (UP) Sunken Garden.

The band become the cover of the May 2000 Issue in the Pulp Magazine.

On August 30, 2000, The band released its fifth studio album, aptly called Free. entirely for free on the Internet as well as on CDs distributed at their gigs. Free went on to be named "Album of the Year" at the NU Rock Awards and Rico Blanco winning Producer of the Year for producing the album and Teeth's "I was a Teenage Tree" album.

Second evolution of lineup (2001–2007)
In April 2001, Nathan Azarcon departed from the group to focus on other musical interests (later revealed he got kicked out due to unruly off-screen behavior), leaving Rico Blanco and Mark Escueta as remaining members. Japs Sergio (from Daydream Cycle) filled in on Azarcon's position in gigs. They were later signed with Viva Records and released an EP "Alab ng Puso" [Fire of the Heart] on June 2001, an original soundtrack for the film Buhay Kamao which starred Robin Padilla. The EP also featured a remix by Raimund Marasigan's Squid 9. By Summer of 2001, J-John Valencia (who had been a session guitarist for the band since 1996) has left the band. By May 2001, the lineup was changed as they recruited familiar local guitar heroes, Victor "Kakoy" Legaspi (from blues band Mr. Crayon) and Mike Elgar (from 7 Foot Junior), with Sergio officially absorbed in the band as well. They later began writing songs recording for their 6th studio album. The new line-up made its first performance at NU Pocket Concerts in Alabang Town Center on June 2, 2001. It would allow Rico Blanco to handle vocal duties full-time during live shows.

By August 2001, the band had finished recording for their 6th studio album, Tuloy ang Ligaya, which was released on October 15, 2001 ['The Fun Continues'] and released singles including "Umaaraw, Umuulan" [Sometimes It Shines, Sometimes It Rains] and "Wag Na Init Ulo, Baby" [Don't Be Mad Anymore, Baby]. Their music videos won the Favorite Group Video in the MTV Pilipinas Music Award in 2002 and 2003, respectively. The video for "Wag Na Init Ulo, Baby" won a special award for Highest Jump in the same event in 2003.

The band became the cover again of the October–November 2001 Issue in the Pulp Magazine.

On December 8, 2001, the band also performed at the Fort (also known as Bonifacio Global City) to celebrate Pulp Magazine 2nd Anniversary also dubbed as "The Freakshow".

On August 3, 2002, the band opened for the English New Wave Band The Lotus Eaters on their Concert at Rockwell Club Tent, Makati City.

In September 2003, the band announced a US tour to promote the album Tuloy Ang Ligaya.

On October 10, 2003, they released their 7th studio album Between the Stars and the Waves containing the singles "A Love to Share", "Balisong" [Butterfly Knife], "Sunday Driving", "Table for Two", "241", and "Atat" [Eager]. A Special Edition of the album were released in December 2004 featuring 2 new songs "Liwanag Sa Dilim" and the acoustic version of the song.

International success (2004–2007)
The band were nominated in the MTV Asia Awards 2004 for Favorite Artist Philippines, which was won by Parokya ni Edgar.

In mid 2004, Legaspi resigned from the band for undisclosed reasons. He then later performed as a session player with other musicians such as Julianne Tarroja, and Peryodiko, among others, thus, the band became a four-piece line-up once again and has been that ever since.  In July of that same year, the band released a jingle for and became the endorser of Greenwich Pizza; the limited physical CD featuring their jingle was available in every outlet of the pizza chain.

On February 5, 2005, the band won Favorite Artist Philippines in MTV Asia Awards 2005.

The band found a variety of partners who commissioned such works as "Liwanag sa Dilim" [Light In The Dark], "Posible" [Possible] (Southeast Asian Games' Athletes Anthem), released on November 7, 2005, "Makaasa Ka" (from Globe), released on July 16, 2005, and "You'll Be Safe Here".

"You'll Be Safe Here", originally created as the theme for the ABS-CBN TV series Spirits was released as an EP by Warner Music Philippines and became the song that MTV Asia selected for performance at the 2006 Asia Awards. Kelly Rowland of Destiny's Child introduced the group, and they were backed up by Thailand’s Royal Symphony Orchestra during their live performance. It was the first time that a Filipino band was invited to perform in the event.

An album of compiled works, also titled You'll Be Safe Here, was distributed in Singapore, Thailand, Malaysia, and Indonesia.

Rivermaya embarked on a series of Asian tours, including at Thailand's Pattaya Music Fest (2005, 2008, 2009) as well as Singapore's Mosaic Festival (run by The Esplanade); and Bangkok's Fat Fest as well as in Indonesia's MTV Staying Alive show.
In the Philippines, on December 13, 2005, the band released a compilation album called Greatest Hits 2006 album. The album hit gold award at February 2006, followed by an album dedicated to its music heroes: Isang Ugat, Isang Dugo ['One Root, One Blood'] released on October 10, 2006. At the end of March 2007, Rivermaya scored again another first for the Philippines as their videos, "You'll Be Safe Here" and the recent video remake "Balisong" were chosen as the first Asian artists to have full-length music videos featured on the Star World Channel.

Also during this time, Rivermaya has been often referred to as "Banda ng Bayan" [The Band of the Nation], a nickname they share with Parokya ni Edgar.

Departure of Rico Blanco (2007)

On May 24, 2007, Rico Blanco officially announced his departure from the group citing personal reasons. His last performance with the band was on May 4, 2007, at the Metro Bar. Despite the rumors that the band would eventually disband, both Rivermaya and its management denied the rumors as a result.

After Rico Blanco left, Rivermaya released a new single, "Sayang" [Such a Waste], penned and sung by Japs Sergio and described by the band as "an open letter to the fans", the single premiered on June 22, 2007. In addition, Studio 23 announced the selection of Rivermaya to create the new theme song for the station. The new song is titled "Sumigaw" [Shout] and marks the release of a second single in two months for the band, accelerating Rivermaya's pace for new songs rapidly (in previous years, the band had managed to release only a single every 12 months).

On August 11, 2007, during a mini press conference held at Mogwai Bar and Café in Cubao's Marikina Shoe Expo, Rivermaya released its all-new 5-song Bagong Liwanag ['New Light'] EP, which hit stores nationwide starting August 15. This 5-song EP is released on the band's own label, Revolver Music, and licensed to Warner Music Philippines.

Third evolution of lineup (2007–2012)
On August 24–25, 2007, The band held a two day audition for a new vocalist. The auditions was televised on Studio 23, which was titled Bagong Liwanag. Aside from the band members, main judges are Rivermaya manager Lizza Nakpil, The Dawn guitarist Francis Reyes, and Razorback bassist Louie Talan. On October 24, 2007, then-18-year-old Jayson Fernandez (usually spelled as "Jason") was announced as the winner and new member of Rivermaya.

On December 7, 2007, the band opened for the American alternative rock band Vertical Horizon in their concert at the Araneta Coliseum.

On January 21, 2008, Rivermaya released the album entitled Buhay ['Life'] with the carrier single "Sugal ng Kapalaran" [Gamble of Fate] penned by Sergio with both Fernandez and Sergio doing the vocals, while Elgar and Escueta do backing vocals. During this time, the band parted ways with manager-director Chito Roño and Lizza Nakpil.

On May 30, 2008, the band opened for the American pop rock band The Click Five in their concert at the Araneta Coliseum.

Rivermaya has played in Singapore at the Marina Bay New Year Countdown on December 31, 2008, while in September 2009, the group is the first Filipino band invited to perform on 3 different stages at the 2009 Formula 1 Singapore Grand Prix. and in the same month and year, the band released the album Closest Thing to Heaven with the track "Dangal" [Dignity] as the carrier single.

On January 9, 2010, the band opened for Ne Yo in his concert at SM Mall of Asia Concert Ground. Also, the band announced a nationwide album tour.

Band name ownership disputes (2008–2009)
After allegedly discovering several acts of misappropriation of funds involving the bands' royalties and talent fees, then Rivermaya band members announced that the band had parted ways with their longtime manager Lizza G. Nakpil on October 29, 2008. She was charged with the crime of estafa, sued for damages, and the court issued a Writ of Preliminary Injunction forbidding further contact with Rivermaya. Also in October 2008, longtime member Mark Escueta filed his own application at the Intellectual Property Office (IPO), solely in his name for Rivermaya but was rejected by the IPO. In August 2009, a decision of the IPO confirmed that the "Rivermaya" name ownership of the trademark belongs to Nakpil. However, in October of the same year, Escueta was granted with a Temporary Restraining Order (TRO) issued by the Regional Trial Court of Lucena City. The TRO prevents Nakpil from claiming sole ownership of the "Rivermaya" band name while the case and appeal issued by both parties are still being studied by the court, thus allowing Escueta to continue using the band name regardless of the IPO decision as there was no Entry of Judgment/Execution that has been issued. On November 15, 2012, the Bureau of Legal Affairs of the Intellectual Property Office posted a notice of order stating that Nakpil had come to an agreement with the band members to withdraw her pending application for registration of the name Rivermaya and not to hinder the application of the aforementioned name filed by Escueta.

Departure of Jayson Fernandez and Japs Sergio (2011–2012) 
On February 22, 2011, Rivermaya's official Facebook page announced that they would release their music video titled "Remenis" [Reminisce] and the music video was released on February 28 on Myx Channel. On August 28, 2011, Jayson Fernandez left Rivermaya after 4 years with the group citing musical differences as the primary reason.  Paolo Valenciano (son of Gary Valenciano) of Salamin, Pochoy Labog of Malay and Dicta License, and Vinci Montaner of Parokya ni Edgar are among the notable personalities who simultaneously filled in as temporary lead vocalists for some occasional gigs weeks after Fernandez's departure. After taking a brief hiatus, in November 2012, Japs Sergio posted on his official Facebook page that he left Rivermaya, in order to pursue his new band, Peso Movement.

Fourth evolution of lineup (2012–2016)

In 2012, on a gig at Hard Rock Cafe, the band formally introduce their new members, Ryan Peralta who was the band's regular session player and Norby David of the band Overtone.

Panatang Makabanda and mini reunion (2012–2016)
On February 2013, the band released the single "Pilipinas, Kailan Ka Magigising". to promote their upcoming album.

On March 19, 2013, Rivermaya released the album Panatang Makabanda ['Vow of a Band Passionate']. and a repackaged edition was released on January 15, 2015.

On May 8, 2013, the band opened for the American rock band Aerosmith in their Concert at SM Mall of Asia Arena.

On 2014, the band collaborated with Khomeini Bansuan on the song "Kapayapaan" which was used as a theme song for the Movie "Magnum. 357". which is an official entry to the 2014 Metro Manila Film Festival.

On January 9, 2016, members from the original classic line-up consisting of Perf de Castro, Nathan Azarcon, Mark Escueta and Rico Blanco were re-united at 19 East, Muntinlupa after an invitation from de Castro following his gig. It was also Escueta's 40th birthday. The gig, which they dubbed as a "secret mini semi-reunion", was composed of Rico Blanco on keyboards, de Castro on guitars, Azarcon on bass guitar and Escueta on drums. Blanco and de Castro simultaneously switch over lead vocals all throughout the performance while Azarcon and Escueta provided backing vocals. Bamboo Mañalac was invited as well however it was reported that he was out of the country on that date. Mike Elgar and Ryan Peralta are reportedly present backstage watching the original members perform.

Fifth evolution of lineup (2016–present)

Departure of David and return of Azarcon (2016)
On February 12, 2016, the band released the music video for their fifth and final single "Tayo" on Facebook and later uploaded on YouTube on March 9, 2016. On March 6, 2016, bassist and vocalist Norby David posted a statement on Facebook that he quit the band primarily claiming it was ultimately a lack of communication as the reason for his departure. Days after his departure, former members Japs Sergio and Nathan Azarcon took over bass duties in live shows. Later on, Azarcon have permanently replaced David and returned full-time to the band after 15 years.

Sa Kabila ng Lahat and departure of Ryan Peralta (2016–2018)
In mid-2016, the band began recording for their upcoming 13th studio at Tower of Doom Studios in Diliman, Quezon City with former member Japs Sergio co-producing the album. On May 22, 2017, the band signed with ABS-CBN-owned record label Star Music and later announced that it will release its 13th studio album, Sa Kabila ng Lahat. The first single, "Manila" was released on June 14, 2017. On September 7, 2017, the band released a lyric video of their second single, "8 to 5". The album was released on September 15 on all digital platforms nationwide and an album tour was also announced.

On February 10, 2018 the band performed on the Playback Music Festival at Circuit Grounds, Makati. Also on the same year, the band was chosen to represent the Philippines to perform in the 16th Soundrenaline Music Festival, one of the biggest music festival on Indonesia. In late 2018, Peralta voluntarily left the band in good terms prompting Escueta to switch back to playing drums.

Present status (2019–present)

On May 15, 2019, Rivermaya was honored as the newest MYX Magna Award 2019 for contributing OPM Rock band history and they're the 3rd OPM Rock Band honored and won as MYX Magna Award after Eraserheads in 2012 & Parokya Ni Edgar in 2014.
On May 7, 2022, the band release a lyric video of their new single "Casino", their first single since 2018, followed by a Music Video released on May 12, 2022.

Members

Discography
 For a full, detailed list, see: Rivermaya discography
 Rivermaya (1994)
 Trip (1996)
 Atomic Bomb (1997)
 It's Not Easy Being Green (1999)
 Free (2000)
 Tuloy ang Ligaya (2001)
 Between the Stars and Waves (2003)
 You'll Be Safe Here (EP) (2005)
 Isang Ugat, Isang Dugo (2006)
 Bagong Liwanag (EP) (2007)
 Buhay (2008)
 Closest Thing to Heaven (2009)
 Panatang Makabanda (2013)
 Sa Kabila ng Lahat (2017)

Awards and nominations

References

External links
 Philippine Entertainment Portal Article on Rico Blanco's departure from Rivermaya

Filipino alternative rock groups
Musical groups established in 1994
Star Music artists
Universal Records (Philippines) artists
Musical groups from Metro Manila